This paleobotany list records new fossil plant taxa that were to be described during the year 2023, as well as notes other significant paleobotany discoveries and events which occurred during 2023.

Algae

Chlorophytes

Phycological research
 Yang et al. (2023) reinterpret Protomelission as an early dasycladalean green alga.

Lycopodiopsida

Ferns and fern allies

Conifers

Cheirolepidiaceae

Pinaceae

Flowering plants

Superasterids

Ericales

General Superasterid research

Superrosids

Cucurbitales

Fabales

Fagales

Malpighiales

Malvales

Myrtales

Rosales

Sapindales

Other angiosperms

Other plants

Other plant research
 Fu et al. (2023) report the presence of ovules enclosed within the ovaries of specimens of Nanjinganthus dendrostyla, and consider their findings to be consistent with the interpretation of Nanjinganthus as an Early Jurassic angiosperm.

Palynology

Palynological research
 Malaikanok et al. (2023) describe fossil pollen grains of members of the family Fagaceae from the Oligocene to Miocene Ban Pa Kha Subbasin of the Li Basin (Thailand), and interpret the studied fossils as indicating that, contrary to previous interpretations of the palynological record, tropical Fagaceae-dominated forests existed in northern Thailand at least since the late Paleogene and persisted into the modern vegetation of Thailand.

Research
 A study on early land plant diversity patterns across known paleogeographical units (Laurussia, Siberia, Kazakhstania, Gondwana) throughout the Silurian and Devonian periods is published by Capel et al. (2023)
 A study on the survivorship and migration dynamics of plants from the paleocontinent Angarida during the Frasnian-Tournaisian internal, as indicated by fossil record from the Siberian platform (Russia), is published by Dowding, Akulov & Mashchuk (2023).
 Barrón et al. (2023) study the floral assemblages from the Cretaceous Maestrazgo Basin (Spain), providing evidence of the existence of conifer woodlands and fern/angiosperm communities thriving in the mid‐Cretaceous Iberian Desert System, and report that the studied assemblages can generally be related to others from Europe and North America, but also included plants that were typical for northern Gondwana.
 A study on the fossil material of plants from the Cenomanian deposits of the Western Desert (Egypt) is published by El Atfy et al. (2023), who report the presence of five main vegetation types, and interpret the studied fossils as indicative of an overall warm and humid climate, punctuated by repeated phases of drier conditions.
 Description of fossil wood from the Brown Sands and Flat Sands localities in the Pliocene Usno Formation (Lower Omo valley, Ethiopia) is published by Jolly-Saad & Bonnefille (2023), who report that the studied assemblages strongly differ from other Miocene and Pliocene wood assemblages from Ethiopia, and interpret them as indicative of a seasonal climate and more humid climatic conditions compared to the present, but also as indicative of instability of climatic and environmental conditions, with significant changes in the composition of the tree cover during the time of existence of Australopithecus afarensis.
 A study on changes in functional diversity of plants from southeast Australia during the last 12,000 years, inferred from long-term pollen records, is published by Adeleye et al. (2023).
 The oldest flower and seed fossils of the wind-pollinated besom heaths, Erica sect. Chlorocodon, were found in Madeira Island within a 1.3 million-year-old fossil deposit.

References 

2023 in paleontology
Paleobotany